Gracia Cocina Mexicana, or simply Gracia, is a Mexican restaurant in Seattle's Ballard neighborhood, in the U.S. state of Washington.

Description 
Gracia is a Mexican restaurant on Ballard Avenue in Ballard, Seattle. The menu has included tacos with pork, duck and lamb, burritos, enchiladas, gorditas, huarachitos, and seafood tostadas. The Queso Fundido has vegetarian chorizo and corn tortillas, and the Pulpo a la Macha has octopus, focaccia, salsa macha aioli and onions. The drink menu has been described as "tequila- and mezcal-driven".

History 
The restaurant opened in February 2016. The business participated in Day Without Immigrants 2017.

Reception 
In 2020, during the COVID-19 pandemic, Eater Seattle included the restaurant in a list of "Where to Get Terrific Tacos in Seattle for Takeout and Delivery". The website's Dylan Joffe, Megan Hill, and Jade Yamazaki Stewart included Gracia in a 2022 list of "16 Marvelous Mexican Restaurants in the Seattle Area". Hill and Stewart also included the business in a 2022 list of "15 Spots for Fantastic Tacos in the Seattle Area".

See also 

 List of Mexican restaurants

References

External links 

 
 Gracia at Zomato

2016 establishments in Washington (state)
Ballard, Seattle
Mexican restaurants in Seattle
Restaurants established in 2016